Payam Naderi Dehkordi (born 10 May 1977) is an Iranian actor and theater director. He is best known for his role as Michael Hashemian in Gando (2019–2021).

Filmography

Film

Web

Television

Theater
The Death of A Salesman - dir. Nader Borhani Marand
Rhinocéros - dir. Vahid Rahbani
Romulus The Great - dir. Nader Borhani Marand

References

External links 

 

1977 births
Living people
Audiobook narrators
Iranian male film actors
Iranian male stage actors
University of Tehran alumni
Iranian male television actors
Islamic Azad University alumni
People from Chaharmahal and Bakhtiari Province